Hohentwiel is an extinct volcano in the Hegau region of Baden-Württemberg in southern Germany The mountain is west of the city of Singen and 20 miles (30 km) from Lake Constance.

Hohentwiel began forming, along with the chain of volcanoes in the Hegau region, about 7–8 million years ago, when a layer of volcanic ash and stone was laid down. The magma consists of phonolite. In the following millions of years, the core was opened 260 metres beneath the surface by the glaciers from the ice age. This formed the core that is now exposed, after the ensuing millions of years of erosion.

Hohentwiel Castle, whose ruins are on top of Hohentwiel, was built in 914 using stone taken from the mountain by Burchard II, Duke of Swabia. Originally, the Monastery of St. Georg was within the fortress, but in 1005 it was moved to Stein am Rhein (now in Switzerland), and the Swabian dukes lost control of Hohentwiel.
In the later Middle Ages the noble families von Singen-Twiel (12th–13th centuries), von Klingen (to 1300) and von Klingenberg (to 1521) resided here. In 1521, it was passed on to Duke Ulrich von Württemberg, who developed Hohentwiel into one of the strongest fortresses of his duchy. During this time, it began to be used as a prison, and in 1526, Hans Müller von Bulgenbach, a peasant commander, was imprisoned there before he was executed.

The fortress resisted five Imperial sieges in the Thirty Years' War, under the command of Konrad Widerholt between 1634 and 1648. 
The effect was that Württemberg remained Protestant, while most of the surrounding areas returned to Catholicism in the Counterreformation. The castle served as a Württemberg prison in the 18th century and was destroyed in 1801 after being peacefully handed over to the French. Today the former fortress Hohentwiel is the biggest castle ruin in Germany.

The modern city of Singen nestles at the foot of the mountain.

See also
 List of volcanoes in Germany

References

External links

 virtual Hohentwiel tour

Extinct volcanoes
Mountains and hills of Baden-Württemberg
Volcanoes of Germany
Miocene volcanoes
Mountains and hills of the Hegau